The Venostes were a Celtic or Rhaetian tribe dwelling in the present-day Vinschgau Valley (Val Venosta) during the Iron Age.

Geography 
The Venostes dwelled in the Vinschgau valley. They were located south of the Focunates, west of the Isarci, north of the Tuliassi, and east of the Rugusci.

History 
They are one of the Alpine tribes conquered by Rome in 16–15 BC. The Venostes appear as the fourth tribe in the inscription on the Tropaeum Alpium. In the secondary tradition of the text by Pliny the Elder their position in the list was exchanged with the Vennonetes and the Venostes appear as the third tribe.

Culture 
Their ethnic identity remains unclear. They have been variously described as a Celtic or as a Rhaetian tribe.

References

Primary sources

Bibliography 

Historical Celtic peoples
Gauls
Tribes of pre-Roman Gaul
Ancient peoples of Italy